BLK (initials for "Beyond Limits Known") is an Australian sporting goods manufacturing company which was established in 1999 in the city of Gold Coast in Queensland.

The overall but now heavily transitioned company has origins as far back as 1999, but evolved from the Australian arm of the brand KooGa. Australian founder Kim Brant began to re-brand KooGa Australia to 'BLK' in 2011. Kooga New Zealand was independent and had no ownership connection with Kooga Australia. 

The parent company of BLK, World Rugby Specialists, was placed into external receivership in November 2016. In January 2017, BLK was acquired by a consortium of Fijian and East Timor investors (led by oil and energy company Esperança Timor Oan), amid BLK's financial issues.

Sponsorships 
BLK is the official supplier and sponsor of sports teams, players, associations and events, including:

Rugby league 
  New Zealand

Rugby union

National teams 
  India
  Kenya

Club teams 
  London Irish
  Connacht
  Stormers
  Western Province
  Cheetahs
  Free State Cheetahs

See also

 List of fitness wear brands

References

External links
 

Clothing brands of Australia
Sportswear brands
Sporting goods brands
Sporting goods manufacturers of Australia
Manufacturing companies based on the Gold Coast, Queensland
2011 establishments in Australia